Schinia purpurascens is a moth of the family Noctuidae. It is found in Russia and Turkey.

External links
Fauna Europaea
Checklist of moths of Turkey

Schinia
Moths of Asia
Moths described in 1809